John D. "Jack" Goeken (August 22, 1930 – September 16, 2010) was a prolific telecommunications entrepreneur born in Joliet, Illinois. He was the original founder of Microwave Communications Inc., better known as MCI Inc.  Goeken was an unwitting monopoly-buster, but his technological innovations made him one of the most significant inventors of the late 20th century.

Founding of MCI
According to various press reports and the book "On the Line" by Larry Kahaner, Jack Goeken founded MCI in the 1960s so that he could expand his radio-repair business. He reasoned that if he could set up a microwave repeater system between Chicago and St. Louis, he would be able to sell more radios to truckers.  When Goeken tried to apply for a license to establish his repeater system, he learned that AT&T had a monopoly on such communications, and that he would be denied a license.  Goeken, being a tenacious entrepreneur, challenged against what he believed to be an injustice using the court system. Eventually, the lawsuit he filed would lead to the breakup of AT&T and usher in an era of competition for the telecommunications industry.

Other companies
MCI made Goeken a multimillionaire, and he used his personality and wealth to found many other innovative companies, including the FTD Mercury Network (flower delivery), Airfone (later sold to GTE), In-Flight Phone Corp.,  and many others. Mr. Goeken established Goeken Group Corporation as the vehicle to manage his business ventures. 

After selling Airfone Corp. to GTE Corp., Goeken alleged that GTE breached their contract by not allowing him to run the company as he saw fit, and he asked a court to void his non-compete agreement. A court agreed, and Goeken then founded In-Flight Phone Corporation in Oakbrook Terrace, Illinois, with the intent of competing with GTE Airfone, which held a monopoly on air-to-ground telecommunications.  In 1990, the FCC approved Goeken's plan to share the Airfone frequencies, and solicited applications for and subsequently issued licences to several companies to operate digital Terrestrial Aeronautical Public Correspondence (TAPC) services. In-Flight Phone Corp. was awarded one of these licenses, and Goeken was clear to compete with GTE Airfone. 

In-Flight Phone Corporation attracted more than $200 million from investors, and Goeken set out to build the first nationwide digital air-to-ground telecommunications network, capable of delivering static-free telephone calls, internet service and information services, to airplane seats. The company successfully competed for service contracts with USAir and other airlines.  In 1996, Goeken sold In-Flight Phone Corp. to MCI Corp.

Personal life
Goeken was an alumnus of Joliet Central High School. His early days in founding MCI are recounted in the book On The Line, by Larry Kahaner.

Goeken's personal biography is at

References

American telecommunications industry businesspeople
Businesspeople from Illinois
1930 births
2010 deaths
Deaths from esophageal cancer
Deaths from cancer in Illinois
20th-century American inventors